Transtillaspis pichinchana is a species of moth of the family Tortricidae. It is found in Pichincha Province, Ecuador.

The wingspan is about 19 mm. The ground colour of the forewings is cream with an ochreous brown admixture. The suffusions, strigulae (fine streaks) and spots are brown and the markings are brown with some dark brown parts. The hindwings are pale brownish, but more cream in the basal third.

Etymology
The species name refers to the province of Pichincha, the type locality.

References

Moths described in 2008
Transtillaspis
Taxa named by Józef Razowski